The following is a timeline of the history of the city of Hampton, Virginia, United States.

17th century

 April 30th, 1607
 European settlers arrive at Old Point Comfort and establish settlement of Mill Creek (later Phoebus) just outside the Algonquin village of Kecoughtan
 July 9th, 1610
 European settlers permanently drive out the Native Americans from Kecoughtan.
 1610
 Fort Charles and Fort Henry built.
 St. John's Church founded.
 1619 - Mill Creek settlement becomes part of newly formed Elizabeth Cittie.
 August 1619 First enslaved Africans brought to the Virginia Colony, landing at Point Comfort. A few days later additional enslaved Africans are brought to Point Comfort. Resource www.Hampton.gov 
 1630 - Trading post established.
 1634 - Settlement becomes part of newly formed Elizabeth City County.
 1680 - Town of Hampton established per "Act of Cohabitation."

18th century

 1705 - Hampton becomes a "port of entry."
 1715 - Hampton designated seat of Elizabeth City County.
 1718 - Head of dead pirate Blackbeard displayed on a pole at place later known as "Blackbeard's Point."
 1727 - St John’s church was re-built. 
 1755 - "1,000 Acadian" travellers stay temporarily in Hampton.
 1788 - Hampton becomes part of the new U.S. state of Virginia.

19th century

 1805 - Hampton Academy active.
 1813 - Hampton taken by British forces during the War of 1812.
 1823 - U.S. Fort Monroe built.
 1849
 March: Town of Hampton incorporated.
 December: Town incorporation repealed.
 1852 - Town incorporated again.
 1857 - Chesapeake Female College built.
 1860
 Town incorporation repealed again.
 Population: 1,848.
 1861 - August: Residents set fire to town in order to repel Union forces during the American Civil War.
 1865 - February 3: U.S.-Confederate Hampton Roads Conference held aboard the steamboat River Queen to discuss terms to end the American Civil War.
 1868 - Hampton Agricultural and Industrial Institute and its museum established.
 1870 - National Home for Disabled Volunteer Soldiers Southern Branch begins operating.
 1871 - Hampton Institute Press founded.
 1872 - Hampton Institute's Southern Workman journal begins publication.
 1875 - Booker T. Washington graduates from Hampton Institute.
 1876
 Hampton Monitor newspaper begins publication.
 County courthouse built.
 1878 - Little England Chapel built.
 1882 - Railroad begins operating.
 1884
 Fire.
 Bulletin newspaper begins publication.
 1887 - Town incorporated again once more.
 1889
 Citizens Railway (trolley) begins operating.
 People's Building and Loan Association in business.
 1890 - Population: 2,513.
 1891 - Dixie Hospital nursing school established.
 1897 - Annual Hampton Negro Conference held at the Hampton Institute begins.
 1900 - Population: 2,764.

20th century

 1903 - Hampton Institute's Huntington Memorial Library built.
 1908
 March 4: City of Hampton incorporated.
 B’nai Israel synagogue built.
 1912 - American Theatre built.
 1915 - Apollo Theatre in business.
 1916 - Braddock monument erected.
 1917 - U.S. military Langley Field (airfield) and its Langley Memorial Aeronautical Laboratory (later NASA Langley Research Center) begin operating.
 1920
 Scott Theatre opens.
 Population: 6,138.
 1922 - February 21: U.S. military airship Roma explodes during test flight.
 1926 - Taylor Memorial Library opens.
 1928 - Chamberlin Hotel built.
 1930 - "Hampton Veterans' Facility" begins operating.
 1937 - Aberdeen Gardens (housing) built by U.S. Interior Department's Subsistence Homesteads Division.
 1939 - Hampton City Hall built.
 1943 - U.S. Langley Research Center's racially segregated West Area Computers begins operating.
 1948
 WVEC radio begins broadcasting.
 Green Acres Auto Theatre (drive-in cinema) in business.
 1950 - Population: 5,966.
 1952
 July 1: Elizabeth City County (including Phoebus) consolidated into city of Hampton.
 Fort Wool historic site established.
 1954 - October: Hurricane Hazel occurs.
 1957 - Hampton Roads Bridge–Tunnel to Norfolk opens.
 1960
 Interstate 64 highway construction completed.
 Population: 89,258.
1962
Kecoughtan High School founded.
 1964 - WHOV radio begins broadcasting.
 1968
 Thomas Nelson Community College founded.
 Bethel High School built.
 1970 - Hampton Coliseum opens.
 1973 - Coliseum Mall in business.
 1979 - September: Hurricane David occurs.
 1982 - Finite element machine invented at NASA Langley Research Center (approximate date).
 1984 - Hampton University active.
 1987 - Hampton Public Library new building opens.
 1992 - Virginia Air and Space Center established.
 1993 - Bobby Scott becomes U.S. representative for Virginia's 3rd congressional district.
 1994 - Hampton Roads Voice newspaper begins publication.
 1996
 July: Hurricane Bertha (1996) occurs.
 City website online (approximate date).

21st century

 2003 - Hampton History Museum opens.
 2008 - Molly Joseph Ward becomes mayor.
 2010
 U.S. military Joint Base Langley–Eustis in operation near city.
 Population: 137,436.
2011
Fort Monroe decommissioned by the U.S. military
 2016
 Donnie Tuck becomes mayor.
 Hidden Figures movie released, partially set in Hampton.

See also
 Hampton history
 List of mayors of Hampton, Virginia
 National Register of Historic Places listings in Hampton, Virginia
 History of Hampton Roads area
 Timelines of other cities in Virginia: Alexandria, Lynchburg, Newport News, Norfolk, Portsmouth, Richmond, Roanoke, Virginia Beach

References

Bibliography

 
  (Includes information about Hampton)
  (Includes information about Hampton)
 
 
 1917 ed.

External links

 Items related to Hampton, Virginia, various dates (via Digital Public Library of America)

 
Hampton